Afonso Pereira de Lacerda was the fifth captain-major of Portuguese Ceylon. Lacerda was appointed in 1555 under Sebastian of Portugal. He served as captain-major until 1559. He was succeeded by Jorge de Meneses Baroche.

References

Captain-majors of Ceilão
16th-century Portuguese people